Gleidson Gomes Saturnino (born 11 April 1997) is a Brazilian futsal player who plays for Sorocaba and the Brazilian national futsal team as a defender.

References

External links
Liga Nacional de Futsal profile

1997 births
Living people
Brazilian men's futsal players